Almussafes (Spanish: Almusafes) is a municipality in the comarca of Ribera Baixa in the Valencian Community, Spain.

History
Almussafes was originally a Muslim hamlet, consisting of several farmhouses and a tower. There was a customs office there (in Arabic Masaf, from which the name of the town comes: Almasaf) to collect the transit rights of the merchandise entering and leaving the neighboring city of Valencia. In 1672, it was separated from the Benifaió municipality.

Facilities
The town of Almussafes is host for an important factory of the Ford Motor Company.

Gallery

References

Municipalities in the Province of Valencia
Ribera Baixa